Don't Think That is the debut extended play by American rapper BlocBoy JB. It was released on October 30, 2018, and includes guest features from Lil Uzi Vert and Hoodrich Pablo Juan.

The EP was supported by two singles: Both "Don't Say That" featuring Lil Uzi Vert and "Club Roc" were released as the EP's lead singles on October 30, 2018.

Promotion 
BlocBoy shared the cover for the EP on October 23, 2018. Mitch Findlay of HotNewHipHop called the cover "surreal" and "trippy".

Singles 
"Don't Say That", featuring Lil Uzi Vert, was released as the EP's first single on October 30, 2018, along with the EP.

"Club Roc" was released as the EPs second single on October 30, 2018. A music video was released on the same day. Later on, BlocBoy broke down the song for music company Genius.

Music videos 
A music video for "Rich Hoes", featuring Hoodrich Pablo Juan, was released on December 6, 2018.

Critical reception 
Don't Think That received mixed-to-positive reviews from critics. Sheldon Pearce of Pitchfork said that the mixtape's tracks were "good but inessential".

Track listing

References 

2018 debut EPs
Hip hop EPs
BlocBoy JB albums